The Zurich Chess Challenge (ZCC) is one of the major recurring international chess tournaments, combining rapid chess with classical or blitz chess. Zurich shows an exhibition type of tournament, similar at the former Amber chess tournament ambience, which explains some laxness and a comparatively brief duration of the whole event. It takes place in Zurich, Switzerland. The main sponsor is Russian businessman Oleg Skvortsov.

Winners
{| class="sortable wikitable"
! # !! Year !! Challenge winner
|-
|align="center"|1||2012||Two-players match resulted with draw
|-
|align="center"|2||2013||
|-
|align="center"|3||2014||
|-
|align="center"|4||2015||
|-
|align="center"|5||2016||
|-
|align="center"|6||2017||
|}

Zurich Chess Challenge 2012
The Zurich Chess Challenge 2012 was a six-game chess match between Vladimir Kramnik (Russia) and Levon Aronian (Armenia) from 21 to 28 April 2012.  Each player won one game and there were four draws.

{| class="wikitable" style="text-align:center"
|-
! !! Rating !! 1 !! 2 !! 3 !! 4 !! 5 !! 6 !! Total !! Rating change
|- 
|-
| align=left |  || 2801
| 0 ||style="background:black; color:white"| ½ || 1 ||style="background:black; color:white"| ½ || ½ ||style="background:black; color:white"| ½ || 3 || +2
|-
| align=left |  || 2820
|style="background:black; color:white"| 1 || ½ ||style="background:black; color:white"| 0 || ½ ||style="background:black; color:white"| ½ || ½ || 3 || −2
|}

Zurich Chess Challenge 2013
Italy's Fabiano Caruana won the Zurich Chess Challenge 2013 which took place from 23 February to 1 March 2013.

{|class="wikitable" style="text-align: center;"
!No!! Player !! Rating !! 1 !! 2 !! 3 !! 4 !! Points !! Rating change
|- align=center
|-style="background:#ccffcc;"
| 1 || align=left |   || 2757 || X X || ½ 1 || ½ ½ || ½ 1 || 4 || +12
|- align=center
| 2 || align=left | || 2780 || ½ 0 || X X || ½ 1 || ½ ½ || 3 || −1
|- align=center
| 3 || align=left |  || 2810 || ½ ½ || ½ 0 || X X || ½ ½ || 2½ || −9
|- align=center
| 4 || align=left |     || 2740 || ½ 0 || ½ ½ || ½ ½ || X X || 2½ || −1
|}

Zurich Chess Challenge 2014
The Zurich Chess Challenge 2014 took place from 29 January to 4 February 2014. The average rating of its participants is 2801, the highest ever at the time, and it is also the first category 23 tournament ever. Magnus Carlsen won the tournament. 

The opening day included five rounds of blitz to decide the draw, which was won by Carlsen. The main tournament consists of five rounds of classical chess and finally five rounds of rapid chess on the closure day.

Blitz results
{|class="wikitable" style="text-align: center;"
!No!! Player !! Blitz Elo rating !! 1 !! 2 !! 3 !! 4 !! 5 !! 6 !! Points !! SB
|- align=center
|-style="background:#ccffcc;"
| 1 || align=left |  || 2837 || X || ½ || 1 || 0 || 1 || ½ || 3 || 7.25
|- align=center
| 2 || align=left |  || 2863 || ½ || X || 0 || ½ || 1 || 1 || 3 || 6.75
|- align=center
| 3 || align=left |  || 2879 || 0 || 1 || X || 1 || ½ || 0 || 2½ || 6.75
|- align=center
| 4 || align=left |  || 2697 || 1 || ½ || 0 || X || 0 || 1 || 2½ || 6
|- align=center
| 5 || align=left |  || 2827 || 0 || 0 || ½ || 1 || X || 1 || 2½ || 5.25
|- align=center
| 6 || align=left |  || 2719 || ½ || 0 || 1 || 0 || 0 || X || 1½ || 4
|}

Classical results
{|class="wikitable" style="text-align: center;"
!No!! Player !! FIDE ranking !! Elo rating !! 1 !! 2 !! 3 !! 4 !! 5 !! 6 !! Points !! Rating change
|- align=center
|-style="background:#ccffcc;"
| 1 || align=left |  || 1 || 2872 || X || ½ || 1 || 1 || ½ || 1 || 8 || +9
|- align=center
| 2 || align=left |  || 2 || 2812 || ½ || X || 0 || 1 || 1 || ½ || 6 || +4
|- align=center
| 3 || align=left |  || 6 || 2782 || 0 || 1 || X || ½ || ½ || ½ || 5 || +2
|- align=center
| 4 || align=left |  || 3 || 2789 || 0 || 0 || ½ || X || 1 || ½ || 4 || −4
|- align=center
| 5 || align=left |  || 9 || 2773 || ½ || 0 || ½ || 0 || X || 1 || 4 || −3
|- align=center
| 6 || align=left |  || 8 || 2777 || 0 || ½ || ½ || ½ || 0 || X || 3 || −8
|}
For games that ended in a draw in under 40 moves, a subsequent rapid game between the two players was mandatory, although these particular rapid games had no relevance to the tournament standings. Two such games were played: Gelfand–Aronian (0–1) in the third round and Gelfand–Nakamura (1–0) in the fifth round.

Rapid results
{|class="wikitable" style="text-align: center;"
!No!! Player !!  Rapid Elo rating !! 1 !! 2 !! 3 !! 4 !! 5 !! 6 !! Points !! Rating change
|- align=center
|-style="background:#ccffcc;"
| 1 || align=left |  || 2812 || X || 1 || ½ || 1 || ½ || 1 || 4 || +28
|- align=center
| 2 || align=left |  || 2826 || 0 || X || 1 || ½ || 1 || 1 || 3½ || +15
|- align=center
| 3 || align=left |  || 2770 || ½ || 0 || X || 1 || ½ || 1 || 3 || +15
|- align=center
| 4 || align=left |  || 2845 || 0 || ½ || 0 || X || 1 || ½ || 2 || −18
|- align=center
| 5 || align=left |  || 2735 || ½ || 0 || ½ || 0 || X || ½ || 1½ || −10
|-
| 6 || align=left |  || 2800 || 0 || 0 || 0 || ½ || ½ || X || 1 || −30
|}

Combined final results
The combined final score for the tournament was calculated by scoring each game in the classical competition on a 2–1–0 basis and each game in the rapid competition on a 1–½–0 basis.

{|class="wikitable" style="text-align: center;"
!No!! Player !! Points
|- align=center
|-style="background:#ccffcc;"
| 1 || align=left |  || 10
|- align=center
| 2 || align=left |  ||  9
|- align=center
| 3 || align=left |  || 9
|- align=center
| 4 || align=left |  || 7½
|- align=center
| 5 || align=left |  || 5
|- align=center
| 6 || align=left |  || 4½
|}

Zurich Chess Challenge 2015
The 2015 tournament featured Fabiano Caruana, Viswanathan Anand, Vladimir Kramnik, Levon Aronian, Sergey Karjakin and Hikaru Nakamura. The tournament was held from 13-19 February 2015 at the Hotel Savoy Baur en Ville in Zurich.

A Blitz Tournament determined the colors distribution on the first day of the tournament (Friday, February 13, 2015). After the opening, 5 classical games were played following by another 5 rapid games on the last day of the tournament. The rules stated that wins (2 points) and draws (1) count double for classical games, with a draw before move 40 “punished” by an extra rapid game.

Vishy Anand and Hikaru Nakamura ended up with 9 points. For determining the winner, although it was said before that the previous games between two must decide the result, they changed the rules midway and asked the players to play an armageddon game in which Hikaru Nakamura won with the black and ended up as the tournament winner.

Blitz results
{|class="wikitable" style="text-align: center;"
!No!! Player !! Blitz Elo rating !! 1 !! 2 !! 3 !! 4 !! 5 !! 6 !! Points !! SB
|- align=center
|-style="background:#ccffcc;"
| 1 || align=left |  || 2777 || X || ½ || 1 || 1 || ½ || 1 || 4 || 8.75
|- align=center
| 2 || align=left |  || 2811 || ½ || X || ½ || ½ || 1 || 1 || 3.5 || 6.75
|- align=center
| 3 || align=left |  || 2797 || 0 || ½ || X || 1 || 1 || 1 || 3.5 || 5.75
|- align=center
| 4 || align=left |  || 2776 || 0 || ½ || 0 || X || ½ || 1 || 2 || 3.25
|- align=center
| 5 || align=left |  || 2783 || ½ || 0 || 0 || ½ || X || 0 || 1 || 3
|- align=center
| 6 || align=left |  || 2760 || 0 || 0 || 0 || 0 || 1 || X || 1 || 1
|}

Classical results
{|class="wikitable" style="text-align: center;"
!No!! Player !! Elo rating !! 1 !! 2 !! 3 !! 4 !! 5 !! 6 !! Points !! SB
|- align=center
|-style="background:#ccffcc;"
| 1 || align=left |  || 2797|| X || 2 || 1 || 1 || 1 || 2 || 7 || 16.5
|- align=center
| 2 || align=left |  || 2776 || 0 || X || 1 || 2 || 2 || 1 || 6 || 12.5
|- align=center
| 3 || align=left |  || 2783 || 1 || 1 || X || 1 || 1 || 1 || 5 || 12.5
|- align=center
| 4 || align=left |  || 2760 || 1 || 0 || 1 || X || 1 || 1 || 4 || 10
|- align=center
| 5 || align=left |  || 2811 || 1 || 0 || 1 || 1 || X || 1 || 4 || 10
|- align=center
| 6 || align=left |  || 2777 || 0 || 1 || 1 || 1 || 1 || X || 4 || 9.5
|}

Rapid results
{|class="wikitable" style="text-align: center;"
!No!! Player !!  Rapid Elo rating !! 1 !! 2 !! 3 !! 4 !! 5 !! 6 !! Points !! SB
|- align=center
|-style="background:#ccffcc;"
| 1 || align=left |  || 2783 || X || 1 || 1 || 0 || ½ || 1 || 3.5 || 7.75
|- align=center
| 2 || align=left |  || 2777 || 0 || X || ½ || 1 || 1 || ½ || 3 || 6.25
|- align=center
| 3 || align=left |  || 2776 || 0 || ½ || X || ½ || 1 || 1 || 3 || 6
|- align=center
| 4 || align=left |  || 2760 || 1 || 0 || ½ || X || ½ || 0 || 2 || 6
|- align=center
| 5 || align=left |  || 2797 || ½ || 0 || 0 || ½ || X || 1 || 2 || 4.25
|-
| 6 || align=left |  || 2811 || 0 || ½ || 0 || 1 || 0 || X || 1.5 || 2.5
|}

Tiebreak
After the games Nakamura and Anand were the leaders with 9 point. An Armageddon tiebreak game between the two tied leaders, Anand and Nakamura. White was given five minutes, black four. White had to win in order to win the tournament. Hikaru Nakamura won as black making him the winner of the tournament.

Combined final results
The combined final score for the tournament was calculated by scoring each game in the classical competition on a 2–1–0 basis and each game in the rapid competition on a 1–½–0 basis.

{|class="wikitable" style="text-align: center;"
!No!! Player !! Points
|- align=center
|-style="background:#ccffcc;"
| 1 || align=left |  || 9.0
|- align=center
| 2 || align=left |  ||  9.0
|- align=center
| 3 || align=left |  || 8.5
|- align=center
| 4 || align=left |  || 7.0
|- align=center
| 5 || align=left |  || 6.0
|- align=center
| 6 || align=left |  || 5.5
|}

Zurich Chess Challenge 2016 

In the 2016 tournament, held from 12–15 February 2016, starting on a Friday and already ending on the following Monday, players were awarded two points for a win and one point for a draw in the rapid section, and one point for a win and half a point for a draw in the blitz section. No classical chess was played. Hikaru Nakamura won the blitz section on tiebreaks and tied with Viswanathan Anand in the rapid section. Nakamura won the overall event.

The tournament was also held alongside a match between Alexander Morozevich and Boris Gelfand.

Rapid results
{|class="wikitable" style="text-align: center;"
!No!! Player !!  Rapid Elo rating !! 1 !! 2 !! 3 !! 4 !! 5 !! 6 !! Points !! SB
|- align=center
|-style="background:#ccffcc;"
| 1 || align=left |  || 2777 || X || 1 || 1 || 2 || 1 || 2 || 7 || 15
|- align=center
| 2 || align=left |  || 2842 || 1 || X || 1 || 2 || 2 || 1 || 7 || 15
|- align=center
| 3 || align=left |  || 2793 || 1 || 1 || X || 1 || 1 || 2 || 6 || 13.5
|- align=center
| 4 || align=left |  || 2746 || 0 || 0 || 1 || X || 2 || 1 || 4 || 7.5
|- align=center
| 5 || align=left |  || 2682 || 1 || 0 || 1 || 0 || X || 1 || 3 || 8
|-
| 6 || align=left |  || 2756 || 0 || 1 || 0 || 1 || 1 || X || 3 || 7
|}

Blitz results
{|class="wikitable" style="text-align: center;"
!No!! Player !!  Blitz Elo rating !! 1 !! 2 !! 3 !! 4 !! 5 !! 6 !! Points !! SB
|- align=center
|-style="background:#ccffcc;"
| 1 || align=left |  || 2884 || X || ½ || ½ || 1 || 1 || ½ || 3.5 || 7.75
|- align=center
| 2 || align=left |  || 2764 || ½ || X || ½ || ½ || 1 || 1 || 3.5 || 6.75
|- align=center
| 3 || align=left |  || 2817 || ½ || ½ || X || ½ || 1 || 1 || 3.5 || 6.75
|- align=center
| 4 || align=left |  || 2793 || 0 || ½ || ½ || X || ½ || 1 || 2.5 || 4.75
|- align=center
| 5 || align=left |  || 2814 || 0 || 0 || 0 || ½ || X || 1 || 1.5 || 1.75
|-
| 6 || align=left |  || 2682 || ½ || 0 || 0 || 0 || 0 || X || 0.5 || 1.75
|}

Combined final results 
{|class="wikitable" style="text-align: center;"
!No!! Player !! Points !! SB
|- align=center
|-style="background:#ccffcc;"
| 1 || align=left |  || 10.5 || 22.75
|- align=center
| 2 || align=left |  ||  10.5 || 21.75
|- align=center
| 3 || align=left |  || 9.5 || 20.25
|- align=center
| 4 || align=left |  || 5.5 || 11.75
|- align=center
| 5 || align=left |  || 5.5 || 9.25
|- align=center
| 6 || align=left |  || 3.5 || 9.75
|}

Exhibition match results 

A two-game exhibition match was played between Alexander Morozevich and Boris Gelfand, in the same time control as the Rapid portion of the main tournament. Boris Gelfand won the mini-match.

{|class="wikitable" style="text-align: center;"
! !! Player !! FIDE Rating !! 1 !! 2 !! Points
|-
|-style="background:#ccffcc;"
| 1 || align=left | || 2735 || style="background:black; color:white"| ½ || 1 || 1½
|- align=center
| 2 || align=left | || 2683 || ½ || style="background:black; color:white"| 0 || ½
|}

Zurich Chess Challenge 2017

American Hikaru Nakamura won the total standings by winning a blitz tournament half a point ahead of the Indian Viswanathan Anand and a full point ahead of Ian Nepomniachtchi.

See also 
Zürich 1934 chess tournament
Zurich 1953 chess tournament

References

External links 

 Live games

Chess competitions
Chess in Switzerland
Sports competitions in Zürich
International sports competitions hosted by Switzerland
Recurring sporting events established in 2012
2012 establishments in Switzerland